The 2018 United States Senate election in Florida was held on November 6, 2018, alongside a gubernatorial election, elections to the U.S. House of Representatives and other state and local elections. Incumbent Democratic Senator Bill Nelson ran for re-election to a fourth term, but was narrowly defeated by Republican Governor Rick Scott. The election was the closest Senate race in the state's history.

The results of the race were in dispute for 12 days following the election. The results showed that Nelson was narrowly trailing Scott, but the margin remained below 0.5%, triggering an automatic recount under Florida law. A controversial recount ensued, with both campaigns claiming irregularities. Following the recount, Florida elections officials confirmed Scott's victory on November 18, 2018. Scott received 50.05% of the vote, while Nelson received 49.93%; the margin of victory was 10,033 votes out of 8.19 million votes cast, or 0.12%. Both in terms of raw vote margin and by percentage of difference, this was the closest Senate election in the 2018 cycle. Scott's victory marked the first time since the Reconstruction era that Republicans have held both Senate seats in Florida.

Background
Incumbent Democratic Sen. Bill Nelson sought re-election in the 2018 U.S. Senate election in Florida. The election was expected to be a key race in determining which party would control the U.S. Senate in 2019.

As of the second quarter of 2018, Nelson had a 44%-34% approval rating among his constituents. Despite having won re-election in 2012 by a 13% margin, Nelson was considered potentially vulnerable; he had been the only statewide elected Democrat in Florida since 2011, and his previous opponents, Connie Mack IV and Katherine Harris, were seen as much weaker challengers than Scott. Additionally, he was one of 10 incumbent Democratic senators running in states that had been carried by Donald Trump in 2016. Nelson was described as a "low-key centrist" that might not be able to energize progressive voters.

After being encouraged by President Trump to enter the Senate race, Republican Governor of Florida Rick Scott announced his candidacy on April 9, 2018. As of the first quarter of 2018, Scott held a 54%-35% approval rating among his constituents, with a majority of Florida voters believing the state was moving in the right direction under Scott's administration. Republican President Donald Trump also held a positive approval rating of 49%-47% in Florida as of August 2018. Trump had won the state in 2016 by 1.2% over Democratic nominee Hillary Clinton. Scott had put more than $86 million of his own money into his successful 2010 and 2014 gubernatorial bids.

Republican primary
The Republican primary was considered merely a formality, as Governor Scott's lone challenger was a perennial candidate who was running for Senate seats in eight other Republican primaries across the country. No other notable Republicans entered the race before or after Scott announced his candidacy.

Candidates

Nominee
 Rick Scott, incumbent Governor of Florida

Eliminated in the primary
 Rocky De La Fuente, businessman and perennial candidate; American Delta and Reform nominee for president in 2016

Withdrew
 Virginia Fuller, registered nurse; Republican nominee for U.S. Representative from CA-11 in 2012
 Alexander George, businessman, political activist, and minister; candidate for U.S. Senate in 2012
 Augustus Sol Invictus, far-right activist; candidate for U.S. Senate in 2016
 Lateresa Jones, life coach; Independent candidate for lieutenant governor in 2014 and U.S. Senate in 2016 (running as a write-in candidate)
 Martin Mikhail
 Mike Pompura
 Joseph Smith, chiropractor; candidate for U.S. Senate in 1988 and FL-19 in 1996; Republican nominee for FL-16 in 1988
 Marcia R. Thorne, pastor (ran as an Independent)
 Angela Marie Walls-Windhauser, candidate for U.S. Senate in 2016 (ran as a write-in candidate)

Declined
 Jeff Atwater, Chief Financial Officer 2011–2017
 Carlos Beruff, real estate developer and Republican donor; candidate for U.S. Senate in 2016
 Pam Bondi, Attorney General since 2011
 Richard Corcoran, State Representative (District 37) since 2010; Speaker of the Florida House since 2016
 John Delaney, Mayor of Jacksonville 1995–2003
 Ron DeSantis, U.S. Representative from FL-6 2013–2018; candidate for U.S. Senate in 2016 (running for governor)
 Hulk Hogan, semi-retired  professional wrestler, actor, television personality, entrepreneur, and musician
 David Jolly, U.S. Representative from FL-13 2014–2017; candidate for U.S. Senate in 2016
 Carlos Lopez-Cantera, Lieutenant Governor since 2014; candidate for U.S. Senate in 2016
 Tom Rooney, U.S. Representative from FL-17 since 2009

Polling

Results

Democratic primary
As both of Senator Nelson's primary opponents failed to qualify for the ballot, no Democratic primary was held.

Candidates

Nominee
 Bill Nelson, incumbent U.S. Senator since 2001; U.S. Representative from FL-11 1979–1991

Declined
 Randolph Bracy, State Senator (District 11) since 2016
 Tim Canova, law professor; candidate for FL-23 in 2016 (running for FL-23)
 Pam Keith, Navy veteran, labor attorney; candidate for U.S. Senate in 2016 (running for FL-18)

Failed to qualify
 Tamika Lyles
 Randy White

Libertarian Party

Candidates

Withdrew
 Joe Wendt, janitor

Declined
 Augustus Sol Invictus, far-right activist; candidate for U.S. Senate in 2016 (ran as a Republican)
 Roger Stone, political consultant, lobbyist, and strategist

American Independent Party

Candidates

Withdrew
 Ed Shoemaker, psychologist (ran for FL-15)

Independents and write-ins

Candidates

Declared
 Lateresa Jones, life coach; candidate for lieutenant governor in 2014 and U.S. Senate in 2016 (write-in)
 Howard Knepper, businessman and real estate developer; candidate for president in 2012 (write-in)
 Michael S. Levinson, candidate for FL-13 in 2014 and the 2014 special election (write-in)
 Charles Frederick Tolbert, pastor (write-in)
 David Weeks (write-in)

Withdrew
 Edward Janowski
 Scott McCatty (write-in)
 Marcia R. Thorne, pastor
 Angela Marie Walls-Windhauser, Republican candidate for U.S. Senate in 2016 (write-in)

General election
According to The Cook Political Report, the race was one of the 10 most competitive U.S. Senate races in the nation. It was also described as the most expensive U.S. Senate race in the country.

Scott's involvement in a large Medicare fraud case stirred controversy during the general election campaign. Scott responded with ads accusing Nelson of having cut Medicare benefits and stolen from Medicare; fact-checkers found that both of Scott's assertions were "mostly false." During the campaign, Scott characterize[s] Nelson as a "socialist"; PolitiFact described the assertion as "pants-on-fire" false.

Gun control was a key issue in this race. The election came less than nine months after the Stoneman Douglas High School shooting in Parkland, the deadliest school shooting in American history. Nelson also mentioned the Orlando nightclub shooting that occurred in June 2016 and killed 49 people, asserting that —"nothing was done" by Scott's administration. In the wake of Stoneman Douglas, Scott raised the age to purchase a gun from 18 to 21, set a three-day waiting period to purchase assault-style weapons, and banned bump stocks--moves that Nelson described as "doing the bare...minimum". The National Rifle Association opposed Scott's legislation.

Environmental issues also took on a prominent role in the race. Scott and his administration had been heavily criticized for weakening regulations designed to protect the environment, even going as far as to instruct the FDEP not to use the words "climate change" or "global warming" in official reports. Because of this, Scott was blamed for the state's worsening algae blooms, even being dubbed "Red Tide Rick" on social media. Scott blamed the toxic blooms on Nelson and on Congress' general inefficiency.

During the campaign, Scott sought to avoid mentioning President Trump and at times criticized or distanced himself from actions of the Trump administration. Prior to the campaign, he had used his friendship with Trump to boost his profile, had been an early and vocal supporter of Trump in 2016, and reportedly spoke to President Trump every one or two weeks. Trump endorsed Scott in his Senate bid.

Both Nelson's and Scott's responses to Hurricanes Irma and Michael (which made landfall in September 2017 and October 2018, respectively) were closely watched during the campaign season.

Scott made Nelson's age an issue in the campaign.

Debates
 Complete video of debate, October 2, 2018

Endorsements

Predictions

Fundraising

Polling

with Pam Bondi

Initial results and recount
The results of the race were in dispute for 12 days following the election. Because Scott's lead over Nelson was less than 0.5% of the vote, an automatic recount was triggered under Florida law. A controversial recount ensued, with both campaigns claiming irregularities.

Nelson and Scott traded accusations of voter suppression and voter fraud. Two lawsuits were filed by the Scott campaign after the election against the Supervisor of Elections in both Palm Beach and Broward Counties while the Nelson campaign filed one against the Secretary of State in Florida. On November 9, the Scott campaign won both of their lawsuits.  Notably, election officials in Broward County had to receive police protection after accusations of voter fraud were made by a few members of Congress.

Additionally, a number of mail-in ballots were found in a mail distribution center in the city of Opa-locka three days after the election. The Miami-Dade Elections Department considered the votes uncountable because they had not arrived at the department by the time the polls closed.

The deadline for all ballots to be machine-counted was 3:00 pm EST on Thursday, November 15, 2018. The revised totals triggered a statewide hand-recount of rejected ballots. At least three counties (Broward, Hillsborough, and Palm Beach County) missed the deadline. During machine counting, 846 votes from Hillsborough County were lost, presumably due to a power outage. Machines purchased from Sequoia Voting Systems broke down, creating delays in the count of Palm Beach County votes.

Results
Florida elections officials announced on November 18, 2018 that Scott had prevailed. Scott received 50.05% of the vote, while Nelson received 49.93%; the margin of victory was 10,033 votes out of 8.19 million votes cast. Nelson then conceded the race to Scott.

By county
Final results from Florida Division of Elections.

Counties that flipped from Democratic to Republican
 Brevard (largest municipality: Palm Bay)
 Flagler (largest municipality: Palm Coast)
 Franklin (largest municipality: Eastpoint)
 Hamilton (largest municipality: Jasper)
 Hendry (largest municipality: Clewiston)
 Hernando (largest municipality: Spring Hill)
 Jefferson (largest municipality: Monticello)
 Liberty (largest municipality: Bristol)
 Madison (largest municipality: Madison)
 Manatee (largest municipality: Bradenton)
 Marion (largest municipality: Ocala)
 Okeechobee (largest municipality: Okeechobee)
 Pasco (largest municipality: Wesley Chapel)
 Polk (largest municipality: Lakeland)
 Sarasota (largest municipality: North Port)
 Volusia (largest municipality: Deltona)

Edison Research exit poll

Notes

See also
 2018 United States Senate elections
 2018 Florida gubernatorial election

References

External links
 Candidates at Vote Smart
 Candidates at Ballotpedia
 Campaign finance at FEC
 Campaign finance at OpenSecrets

Official campaign websites
 Bill Nelson (D) for Senate
 Rick Scott (R) for Senate

2018
Florida
United States Senate